The Time Is Not Yet Ripe is a 1912 Australian play by Louis Esson. It is a political comedy and is Esson's best known work.

It was first produced by the Melbourne Repertory Theatre at the Athenaeum Hall in 1912.

The Time Is Not Yet Ripe has since come to be acknowledged as an Australian classic, and was later published. Its first major revival was by the Melbourne Theatre Company at the Comedy Theatre in 1973, and it also received professional productions in Sydney in 1977 and Adelaide in 1984.

References

External links
"Playing the 20th century – episode one: The Time is Not Yet Ripe", Radio National, 19 December 2010
The Time is Not Yet Ripe at AusStage
 

1912 plays
Australian plays